Qamcheqay or Qamchaqai or Qomchoqay, also rendered as Kamchakay or Qamchay or Qamchiqah, may refer to:
 Qomchoqay, Kurdistan
 Qamcheqay, Ijrud, Zanjan Province
 Qamcheqay, Khodabandeh, Zanjan Province